Trophis racemosa, commonly named white ramoon, is a species of plant of the fig family native to Latin America.

References 

Moraceae
Plants described in 1753